The 2018 Vissel Kobe season was Vissel Kobe's fifth season back in the J1 League following their promotion in 2013 and their 20th J1 League season. They also competed in the 2018 Emperor's Cup and the 2018 J.League Cup.

Squad
. 

Out on loan

Transfers
Winter

In:

Out:

Summer

In:

Out:

Competitions
J. League

Table

Results summary

Results by round

Results

J. League Cup

Group stage

Knockout stage

Emperor's Cup

Squad statistics

Appearances and goals

|-
|colspan="14"|Players away on loan:|-
|colspan="14"|Players who left Vissel Kobe during the season:''

|}

Goalscorers

Disciplinary record

References

Vissel Kobe
Vissel Kobe seasons